Megalonotus sabulicola is a species of dirt-colored seed bug in the family Rhyparochromidae. It is found in Europe and Northern Asia (excluding China) and North America.

References

Further reading

 
 
 
 

Rhyparochromidae
Articles created by Qbugbot
Insects described in 1870